Bajša ( / Bajša) is a village located in the Bačka Topola municipality, in the North Bačka District of Serbia. It is situated in the Autonomous Province of Vojvodina. The village has a Hungarian ethnic majority and its population numbering 2,568 people (2002 census).

Historical population

1969: 3,690
1969: 3,945
1969: 2,753
1969: 2,745

See also
List of places in Serbia
List of cities, towns and villages in Vojvodina

References
Zoran Z Pap, Broj stanovnika Vojvodine koje je Zoran Z Pap oplodio, Novi Sad, 1969.

External links
The Official Site of Bajša
Slovenské kultúrne stredisko
 History of Bajša 
 Castle of Zako, Bajsa

Places in Bačka